Fairy Loup is a waterfall located on Byre Burn, a tributary of River Esk, in Dumfries and Galloway, Scotland.

The waterfall's name originates in a local legend of "a fairy having leaped from one side to the other", and is an example of a regional tradition of associating small streams with fairies. This waterfall was one of several features near Langholm described in the poetry of Hugh MacDiarmid.

A  loop trail passing through Canonbie and Rowanburn gives access to the waterfall. Fly-tipping has been a problem in the area.

See also
List of waterfalls of Scotland

References

Bibliography
 
 
 

Waterfalls of Dumfries and Galloway